= Kytina =

Town in ancient Thessaly

Kytina (Ancient Greek: Κύτινα) was a town in ancient Thessaly. It is unlocated.
